The Senedd, officially known as the Welsh Parliament in English and  in Welsh, is the devolved, unicameral legislature of Wales. A democratically elected body, it makes laws for Wales, agrees certain taxes and scrutinises the Welsh Government. It is a bilingual institution, with both Welsh and English being the official languages of its business. From its creation in May 1999 until May 2020, the Senedd was known as the National Assembly for Wales.

The Senedd comprises 60 members who are known as Members of the Senedd, abbreviated as "MS". Since 2011, members are elected for a five-year term of office under an additional member system, in which 40 MSs represent smaller geographical divisions known as "constituencies" and are elected by first-past-the-post voting, and 20 MSs represent five "electoral regions" using the D'Hondt method of proportional representation. Typically, the largest party in the Senedd forms the Welsh Government.

A National Assembly for Wales was created by the Government of Wales Act 1998, following the result of the 1997 referendum. The Assembly initially had no powers to make primary legislation. Limited law-making powers were gained through the Government of Wales Act 2006. Its primary law-making powers were enhanced following a Yes vote in the referendum on 3 March 2011, meaning that the UK Parliament or the Secretary of State for Wales were no longer consulted when passing acts of the National Assembly for Wales related to the 20 devolved areas. These powers were further extended by the Wales Act 2014 and Wales Act 2017, with the latter moving the Assembly to a reserved powers model of devolution like that of the Scottish Parliament. In May 2020, the Assembly was renamed to "Senedd Cymru" or "the Welsh Parliament" when section 2 of the Senedd and Elections (Wales) Act 2020 came into force. Matters devolved to the Senedd include health, education, economic development, transport, the environment, agriculture, local government and some taxes.

History

Road to devolution

An appointed Council for Wales and Monmouthshire was established in 1949 to "ensure the government is adequately informed of the impact of government activities on the general life of the people of Wales". The council had 27 members nominated by local authorities in Wales, the University of Wales, National Eisteddfod Council and the Welsh Tourist Board. A post of Minister of Welsh Affairs was created in 1951 and the post of Secretary of State for Wales and the Welsh Office were established in 1964 leading to the abolition of the Council for Wales. The establishment of the Welsh Office effectively created the basis for the territorial governance of Wales. The Royal Commission on the Constitution (the Kilbrandon Commission) was set up in 1969 by Harold Wilson's Labour Government to investigate the possibility of devolution for Scotland and Wales. Its recommendations formed the basis of the 1974 White Paper Democracy and Devolution: proposals for Scotland and Wales, which proposed the creation of a Welsh Assembly. However, Welsh voters overwhelmingly rejected the proposals in a referendum held in 1979.

After the 1997 general election, the new Labour Government argued that an Assembly would be more democratically accountable than the Welsh Office. For eleven years prior to 1997 Wales had been represented in the Cabinet of the United Kingdom by a Secretary of State who did not represent a Welsh constituency at Westminster. A referendum was held in Wales on 18 September 1997 in which voters approved the creation of the National Assembly for Wales with a total of 559,419 votes, or 50.3% of the vote.

The following year the Government of Wales Act was passed by the United Kingdom parliament, establishing the Assembly. On 1 July 1999 the powers of the Secretary of State for Wales were transferred to the Assembly and the Welsh Office ceased to exist.

In July 2002, the Welsh Government established an independent commission, with Lord Richard (former leader of the House of Lords) as chair, to review the powers and electoral arrangements of the National Assembly to ensure that it is able to operate in the best interests of the people of Wales. The Richard Commission reported in March 2004. It recommended that the National Assembly should have powers to legislate in certain areas, whilst others would remain the preserve of Westminster. It also recommended changing the electoral system to the single transferable vote (STV) which would produce greater proportionality.

In response, the British government, in its Better Governance for Wales White Paper, published on 15 June 2005, proposed a more permissive law-making system for the Welsh Assembly based on the use of Parliamentary Orders in Council. In so doing, the Government rejected many of the cross party Richard Commission's recommendations. This has attracted criticism from opposition parties and others.

Enhanced powers: The Government of Wales Act 2006

The Government of Wales Act 2006 received Royal Assent on 25 July 2006. It conferred on the Assembly legislative powers similar to other devolved legislatures through the ability to pass Assembly Measures concerning matters that are devolved. Requests for further legislative powers made through legislative competence requests were subject to the veto of the Secretary of State for Wales, House of Commons or House of Lords.

The Act reformed the assembly to a parliamentary-type structure, establishing the Welsh Government as an entity separate from, but accountable to the National Assembly. It enables the Assembly to legislate within its devolved fields.

The Act also reforms the Assembly's electoral system. It prevents individuals from standing as candidates in both constituency and regional seats. This aspect of the act was subject to a great deal of criticism, most notably from the Electoral Commission., though it was supported in the Richard Commission

The Act was heavily criticised. Plaid Cymru, the Official Opposition in the National Assembly from 1999 to 2007, attacked it for not delivering a fully-fledged parliament. Many commentators have also criticised the Labour Party's allegedly partisan attempt to alter the electoral system. By preventing regional Members from standing in constituency seats the party has been accused of changing the rules to protect constituency representatives. Labour had 29 members in the Assembly at the time, all of whom held constituency seats.

The changes to the Assembly's powers were commenced on 4 May 2007, after the election.

Following a referendum on 3 March 2011, the Welsh Assembly gained direct law making powers, without the need to consult Westminster.

Reserved powers model: The Wales Act 2017
The Conservative-Liberal coalition government created the Commission on Devolution in Wales (also known as Silk Commission), composed of members nominated by the 4 parties represented in the Welsh Assembly and several leading legal and political experts, to "create a lasting devolution settlement for Wales". Following the first set of recommendations by the Commission, the UK government announced in November 2013 that some borrowing powers are to be devolved to the Assembly along with control of landfill tax and stamp duty. Additionally the Wales Act 2014 provides for a referendum to be held on the Assembly's ability to set a degree of income tax, though there is a proposal for the requirement for a referendum to be removed.

Both the UK and Welsh governments supported the Silk Commission (Part 2) proposal to move to a "reserved powers" model of devolution (similar to that of the Scottish Parliament and the Northern Ireland Assembly) where the UK government would have specific "reserved" powers and the Welsh Assembly would have control of all other matters. This replaced the previous model where certain powers were "conferred" and all others were assumed to be powers of the UK national government. Since the passing of the Wales Act 2017, the power model in Wales has been in line with that of Scotland, being a reserved matter model.

The Wales Act 2017, based on the second set of recommendations of the Silk Commission, proposed devolving further areas of government, including some relating to water, marine affairs (ports, harbours, conservation), energy (subsidies, petroleum extraction, construction of smaller energy-generating facilities, etc.), rail franchising and road travel.

Name change
In July 2016, Assembly members unanimously agreed that the name of the Assembly should reflect its constitutional status as a national parliament. The Assembly Commission ran a public consultation on the proposal, which showed that 61% of respondents agreed or strongly agreed that the Assembly should change its name. In 2018, the commission announced its intention to introduce legislation to change the name of the Assembly. Later that year, the Llywydd – the Assembly's presiding officer – wrote to all Assembly Members explaining that the name change proposed in the Bill would be the monolingual name "Senedd". In 2019, the Senedd and Elections (Wales) Bill, favouring the name "Senedd", was introduced on behalf of the Assembly Commission. Following support of a subsequent amendment to the Bill which favoured a bilingual name for the institution, the Bill was passed by the Assembly on 27 November 2019 and was given Royal Assent on 15 January 2020. The Act changed the name of the Assembly to "Senedd Cymru" or the "Welsh Parliament". Its guidance states that the institution will be commonly known as the Senedd in both languages. The name change came into effect on 6 May 2020. Members of the renamed body are known as Members of the Senedd (MS), or Aelodau o'r Senedd (AS) in Welsh.

Proposed expansion
On 22 November 2021, Welsh Labour and Plaid Cymru agreed a co-operation deal that will see the implementation of 46 policies that the two parties share. One of these is the expansion of the Senedd from 60 Members to between 80 and 100 Members.

At its Conference on 12 March 2022, Welsh Labour unanimously approved increasing the size of the Senedd. "The expansion of the Senedd is essential because the journey of devolution is not yet complete," former First Minister Alun Michael said. "There is more to come. And the capacity needs to be there for those backbenchers to do the job of holding to account that you rightly said, cannot be done by to smaller number of representatives." Two weeks later, Plaid members backed the expansion proposal as well.

On 10 May 2022, plans to increase the number of MSs from 60 to 96 were unveiled, as well as the scrapping of first past the post, which is currently used to elect 40 of the 60 Members of the Senedd (MSs). Drakeford said these changes were required as "report after report" had demonstrated that the Senedd in its current form "cannot do the job in the way that people in Wales have a right to expect it to be done". Welsh Lib Dem leader Jane Dodds criticised these plans, claiming that they would disproportionately impact smaller parties.

On 8 June 2022, the Senedd voted 40-14 in favour of expanding the number of MSs.

Buildings

Senedd building

The debating chamber in Cardiff Bay, the Senedd (Senate), was designed by the Richard Rogers Partnership, and built by Taylor Woodrow, with environmental, mechanical, electrical and plumbing design by BDSP Partnership. It uses traditional Welsh materials, such as slate and Welsh oak, in its construction, and the design is based around the concepts of openness and transparency. The timber ceiling and centre funnel, manufactured and installed by BCL Timber Projects (sub-contracted by Taylor Woodrow) is made from Canadian sourced Western Red Cedar.

 
The Senedd houses the debating chamber known as the Siambr and Committee Rooms. It was officially opened by Queen Elizabeth II on St David's Day, 1 March 2006.

The Senedd is designed to be environmentally friendly: it uses an Earth Heat Exchange system for heating; rainwater is collected from the roof and used for flushing toilets and cleaning windows, and the roof features a wind cowl which funnels natural light and air into the debating chamber below.

Telecasting

The building houses the debating chamber and committee rooms for the Senedd. When the Senedd building opened on 1 March 2006, there was regular screening of live proceedings from the Siambr on S4C2 and also on internet television. Coverage of the S4C2 screenings were on Tuesdays, Wednesdays and Thursdays between 9:00 am 6:00 pm when the Senedd was sitting. In addition, limited screens were shown on the BBC Two Wales programme "am.pm", including First Minister's Questions. These were decommissioned after S4C2 switched its scheduling to children programs and because of budget cuts. Internet television screenings are now shown on the Senedd's own website called Senedd.tv, which screens approximately 35 hours of content each week in English and Welsh. The service began 15 April 2008. Key events such as First Minister's Questions are shown live and recorded on BBC Parliament on television and on iPlayer. Also on BBC Parliament some proceedings are shown as highlights of the week on the program The Week in Parliament.

Tŷ Hywel and Pierhead Building

The debating chamber was initially based in Tŷ Hywel, next to the site of the present building. The offices of Members are still in this building which is connected to the Senedd by a skyway. The Senedd Commission is also responsible for the Pierhead Building, which is the location of "The Assembly at the Pierhead" exhibition, and is the Visitor and Education Centre for the Senedd as well as housing a small gift shop. The exhibition, currently still in the process of being updated following the 2016 National Assembly for Wales election, provides visitors with information on who's who, what's happening and how the Senedd works.

North Wales Office

The North Wales Information Centre is located in Prince's Park on Prince's Drive, Colwyn Bay. The office is open to the public to access information about the Senedd. The office is open on weekdays between 9:00 and 17:00.

Officials

Elected officials

After each election, the Senedd elects one Member of the Senedd to serve as Llywydd (Presiding Officer) of the Senedd, and another to serve as Dirprwy Lywydd (Deputy Presiding Officer). Elin Jones, Plaid Cymru MS, has been Llywydd since 2016, having taken over from Rosemary Butler. The Llywydd also acts as Chair of the Senedd Commission. Both the Llywydd and the Dirprwy Lywydd typically don't vote in simple-majority votes.

Permanent officials
The permanent administrative and support staff of the Senedd are employed by the Senedd Commission. They are not civil servants, although they enjoy similar terms and conditions of service to members of the UK Civil Service.

Powers and status

The Senedd consists of 60 elected members. They use the title Member of the Senedd (MS) or Aelod o'r Senedd (AS). The executive arm of the Senedd, the Welsh Government, has been a Labour administration since its inception in 1999. Currently it is led by First Minister, Mark Drakeford, since December 2018. The government between 2007 and 2011, had been a coalition between Labour, led by First Minister Carwyn Jones and Plaid Cymru, led by Deputy First Minister Ieuan Wyn Jones; and between 2016 and 2021, Labour had been in coalition with the Liberal Democrats and an independent member. Since 2021, the government has been a Labour minority government that works in co operation with Plaid Cymru. The executive and civil servants are mainly based in Cardiff's Cathays Park while the MSs, the Senedd Commission and Ministerial support staff are based in Cardiff Bay, where a new £67 million building, the Senedd, has been built.

One important feature of the National Assembly until 2007 was that there was no legal or constitutional separation of the legislative and executive functions, since it was a single corporate entity. Compared with other parliamentary systems, and arrangements for devolution in other countries of the UK, this was unusual. In practice, however, there was separation of functions, and the terms "Assembly" and "Assembly Parliamentary Service" came into use to distinguish between the two arms. The Government of Wales Act 2006 regularised the separation when it came into effect following the 2007 Assembly Election.

Initially, the Assembly did not have primary legislative or fiscal powers, as these powers were reserved by Westminster. The Assembly did have powers to pass secondary legislation in devolved areas. Sometimes secondary legislation could be used to amend primary legislation, but the scope of this was very limited. For example, the first Government of Wales Act gave the Assembly power to amend primary legislation relating to the merger of certain public bodies. However, most secondary powers were conferred on the executive by primary legislation to give the executive (i.e. Ministers) more powers, and the Assembly had wider legislative powers than appearances might suggest. For example, the Assembly delayed local elections due to be held in 2003 for a year by use of secondary powers, so that they would not clash with Assembly elections. In 2001 the UK parliament used primary legislation to delay for one month local elections in England during the Foot and Mouth Disease epidemic.

The Assembly gained limited primary legislative powers following the 2007 election and the passage of the Government of Wales Act 2006. These laws are known as Assembly Measures and can be enacted in specific fields and matters within the legislative competency of the Assembly. New matters and fields can be devolved by Acts of the UK Parliament or by LCOs approved by Parliament.

Until 2015 the Assembly had no tax-varying powers, however it could influence the rate of Council Tax set by local authorities, which are part-funded by a grant from the Welsh government. It also has some discretion over charges for government services. Notable examples in which this discretion has been used to create significant differences from other areas in the UK are:

 Charges for NHS prescriptions in Wales – these have now been abolished.
 Charges for University Tuition – are different for Welsh resident students studying at Welsh Universities, compared with students from or studying elsewhere in the UK.
 Charging for Residential Care – In Wales there is a flat rate of contribution towards the cost of nursing care (roughly comparable to the highest level of English Contribution) for those who require residential care.

This means in reality that there is a wider definition of "nursing care" than in England and therefore less dependence on means testing in Wales than in England, so that more people are entitled to higher levels of state assistance. These variations in the levels of charges may be viewed as de facto tax varying powers.

This model of more limited legislative powers created in 1999 was partly because Wales has had the same legal system as England since 1536 (though a different court system until 1830), when it was merged with England. Ireland and Scotland were never merged with England, and so always retained some differences in their legal systems. The Scottish Parliament and the Northern Ireland Assembly both have deeper and wider powers.

The Assembly inherited the powers and budget of the Secretary of State for Wales and most of the functions of the Welsh Office. It has power to vary laws passed by Westminster using secondary legislation.

Following a referendum on 4 March 2011, the Welsh Assembly gained direct law-making powers (without the need to consult Westminster).
On 3 July 2012, the Welsh Assembly passed its first Act, the Local Government Byelaws (Wales) Act.

The Wales Act 2014 and Wales Act 2017 devolved the following taxes to the Welsh Assembly:
 Non-Domestic Rates in Wales – from 1 April 2015
 Land Transaction Tax (LTT) – from 1 April 2018
 Landfill Disposals Tax (LDT) – from 1 April 2018
 Welsh Rates of Income Tax (WRIT) – from 1 April 2019

Powers of the Senedd

The Senedd has the competence to pass bills for Acts of Senedd Cymru in all areas which are not explicitly reserved to Westminster; these 'reserved matters' are outlined in schedule 7A of the Government of Wales Act 2006.

This means the Senedd has powers over areas such as:

 Agriculture, fisheries, forestry and rural development
 Culture
 Economic development
 Education and training
 Environment
 Health and health services
 Highways and transport
 Local government
 Tourism
 Welsh language

Reserved matters include subjects such as:
 Foreign affairs
 Police and justice
 Currency
 Most benefits
 Most taxes

Members, constituencies, and electoral system

  

Under the Additional Member System, forty of the MSs are elected from single-member constituencies on a plurality voting system (or first past the post) basis, the constituencies being equivalent to those used for the House of Commons and twenty MSs are elected from regional closed lists using an alternative party vote. There are five regions: Mid and West Wales, North Wales, South Wales Central, South Wales East and South Wales West (these are the same as the pre 1999 European Parliament constituencies for Wales), each of which returns four members. The additional members produce a degree of proportionality within each region. Whereas voters can choose any regional party list irrespective of their party vote in the constituency election, list MSs are not elected independently of the constituency element; rather, elected constituency MSs are deemed to be pre-elected list representatives for the purposes of calculating remainders in the D'Hondt method. Overall proportionality is limited by the low proportion of list members (33% of the Senedd compared with 43% in the Scottish Parliament and 50% in the German Bundestag), the regionalisation of the list element, and the lack of overhang seat compensation and leveling seats. Consequently, the Senedd as a whole has a greater degree of proportionality (based on proportions in the list elections) than the plurality voting system used for British parliamentary elections, but still deviates somewhat from proportionality. The single transferable vote system had been considered for the Senedd by the Labour Party as early as 1995–96, but according to the evidence given to the Richard Commission by Ron Davies, a former Welsh Secretary,

In April 2020 the Senedd became the first legislature in the UK to meet over the internet. Due to the consequences of the COVID-19 pandemic, it held First Minister's Questions using Zoom videotelephony software and the session was subsequently broadcast by Senedd.tv.

Elections

There have been six elections to the Senedd, in 1999, 2003, 2007, 2011, 2016 and 2021. The 2016 election was delayed from 2015 as the UK general election was held in 2015, and following the passing of the Wales Act 2014, elections occur every five years from the 2016 election.

The next Senedd election is due to be held on Thursday 7 May 2026.

Summary

Notes

Last election

Overall

|-
| style="background:white;" colspan="15"| 
|-
!rowspan=3 colspan=2 | Parties
!colspan=10 | Additional member system
!rowspan=2 colspan=5 | Total seats
|-
!colspan=5 |Constituency
!colspan=5 |Region
|-
! Votes !! % !! +/− !! Seats !! +/− 
! Votes !! % !! +/− !! Seats !! +/−
! Total !! +/− !! %
|-

|}

Turnout
Voter turnout at Senedd elections has been traditionally lower than UK general elections. No election since devolution began has hit 50% turnout, with the 2021 election being the highest at 46.6%. In their 2004 paper Turnout, Participation and Legitimacy in Post-Devolution Wales, academics Roger Awan-Scully, Richard Wyn Jones and Dafydd Trystan Davies identified three potential reasons for this: antipathy to the Welsh institutions, apathy to the Welsh institutions or apathy to politics more generally. They suggested apathy – in Wales and to politics in general – is the most likely reason.

Following the 2021 election, Dr Jac Larner, a politics lecturer at Cardiff University and an investigator for the Welsh election survey, said the lower turnout figures in Wales did not necessarily reflect a lack of perceived importance in the Senedd. He told BBC News: "We know from research that low voter turnout is actually a lot do to with people thinking they can't win in a devolved election, so they don't bother going to vote. That's different to a general election where, in Wales, Labour are still more likely to win a majority of seats, but at the UK level it's far more competitive." He compared turnout in Wales to turnout for Scottish Parliament elections, which is significantly higher: "Scotland is in quite a unique political position at the moment, where the single most salient issue and the biggest cleavage in society – the issue of independence – basically is going to be determined by what happens at the Holyrood elections. Part of it is this idea of interest – there has always been more interest in the idea of a Scottish Parliament, the Scottish Parliament has always been more powerful than the Senedd, even going back to 1999."

Current composition

Government formation
Welsh Labour won 30 seats out of 60 in the 2021 Senedd elections. On 9 May 2021 the First Minister, Mark Drakeford MS said "We have demonstrated over a number of governments that you can govern successfully on 30 seats, but I'm open to working with any party where there is common ground between us."

On 22 November a deal between Welsh Labour and Plaid Cymru was announced. This is not a formal coalition and will not see Plaid Cymru MSs take up Minister or Deputy Minister Posts. However, Plaid Cymru will be able to appoint special advisors to the Welsh Government. The deal will last for three years.

See also

 Contemporary Welsh Law
 Act of Senedd Cymru
 List of by-elections to the Senedd
 Regional Member changes to the Senedd
 London Assembly
 Member of the Senedd
 List of female Members of the Senedd
 1999 National Assembly for Wales election
 2003 National Assembly for Wales election
 2007 National Assembly for Wales election
 2011 National Assembly for Wales election
 2016 National Assembly for Wales election
 2021 Senedd election
 Northern Ireland Assembly
 Senedd constituencies and electoral regions
 Scottish Parliament
 Parliament of the United Kingdom
 United Kingdom budget
 Wales-only laws
 List of Senedd elections
 List of devolved matters in Wales

References

External links

The Queen opens the First Welsh Assembly 1999
Government of Wales Act 1998 
Live internet television from www.senedd.tv
Recorded internet television from the BBC am.pm

 
Politics of Wales
Politics of Cardiff
Unicameral legislatures
1998 establishments in Wales
Welsh parliaments
Legislatures of country subdivisions
Television in Wales
Welsh culture